Noel Scott Engel (January 9, 1943 – March 22, 2019), better known by his stage name Scott Walker, was an American-British singer-songwriter and record producer who resided in England. Walker was known for his emotive voice and his unorthodox stylistic path which took him from being a teen pop icon in the 1960s to an avant-garde musician in the 21st century. Walker's success was largely in the United Kingdom, where his first four solo albums reached the top ten. He lived in the UK from 1965 onward and became a UK citizen in 1970.

Rising to fame in the mid-1960s as frontman of the pop music trio the Walker Brothers, he began a solo career with 1967's Scott, moving toward an increasingly challenging style on late-1960s baroque pop albums such as Scott 3 and Scott 4 (both 1969). After sales of his solo work started to decrease, he reunited with the Walker Brothers in the mid-1970s. From the mid-1980s onward, Walker revived his solo career while moving in an increasingly avant-garde direction; of this period in his career, The Guardian said "imagine Andy Williams reinventing himself as Stockhausen". Walker's 1960s recordings were highly regarded by the 1980s UK underground music scene, and gained a cult following.

Walker continued to record until 2018. He was described by the BBC upon his death as "one of the most enigmatic and influential figures in rock history".

Life and career

Early life
Noel Scott Engel was born on January 9, 1943, in Hamilton, Ohio, the son of Elizabeth Marie (Fortier), who was from Montreal, Quebec, Canada, and Noel Walter Engel. His father was an oil industry manager whose work led the family to successive homes in Ohio, Texas, Colorado and New York. Engel and his mother settled in California in 1959. Engel was interested in both music and performance and spent time as a child actor and singer in the mid to late 1950s, including roles in two Broadway musicals, Pipe Dream and Plain and Fancy. Championed by singer and TV host Eddie Fisher, he appeared several times on Fisher's TV program. Engel cut some records including one named "Misery", which saw him briefly promoted as a teen idol.

Upon his arrival in Los Angeles, Engel had already changed both his taste and his direction. Interested in the progressive jazz of Stan Kenton and Bill Evans, he was also a self-confessed "Continental suit-wearing natural enemy of the Californian surfer" and a fan of European cinema (in particular Ingmar Bergman, Federico Fellini and Robert Bresson) and the Beat poets. In between attending art school and furthering his interests in cinema and literature, Scott played bass guitar proficiently enough to get session work in Los Angeles as a teenager.

In 1961, after playing with the Routers, he met guitarist and singer John Maus, who was using the stage name John Walker on a fake ID to enable him to perform in clubs while under age. The two formed a band, Judy and the Gents, to back John Walker's sister Judy Maus, before joining other musicians to tour as the Surfaris (although they did not play on the Surfaris' records). In early 1964, Engel and John Walker began working together as the Walker Brothers, later in the year linking up with drummer Gary Leeds whose father financed the trio's first trip to the UK.

1964–1967: The Walker Brothers

As a trio, the Walker Brothers cultivated a glossy-haired and handsome familial image. Prompted by Maus, each of the members took "Walker" as their stage surname. Scott continued to use the name Walker thereafter, with the brief exception of returning to his birth name for the original release of his fifth solo album Scott 4, and in songwriting credits. Initially, John served as guitarist and main lead singer of the trio, with Gary on drums and Scott playing bass guitar and mostly singing harmony vocals. By early 1965, the group had made appearances on TV shows Hollywood A Go-Go and Shindig and had made initial recordings, but the start of their real success lay in the future and overseas.

While working as a session drummer, Leeds had recently toured the United Kingdom with P.J. Proby, and persuaded both John and Scott to try their luck with him on the British pop scene. The Walker Brothers arrived in London in early 1965. Their first single, "Pretty Girls Everywhere" (with John still installed as lead singer) crept into the charts but did not place highly. Their next single, "Love Her" – with Scott's deeper baritone in the lead – was a more substantial chart hit and he became the group's frontman.

The Walker Brothers' next release, "Make It Easy on Yourself", a Bacharach/David ballad, went to No. 1 on the UK Singles Chart (number 16 on the U.S. charts) on release in August 1965. After hitting again with "My Ship Is Coming In" (number 3 UK), their second No. 1 (number 13 U.S.), "The Sun Ain't Gonna Shine Any More", shot to the top in early 1966; shortly thereafter their fan club grew to contain more members than the official fan club of the Beatles. Although this is no indication that their actual fan base was larger than that of the Beatles, the Walker Brothers, especially lead singer Scott, attained pop star status.

Finding suitable material was always a problem. The Walkers' 1960s sound mixes Phil Spector's "wall of sound" techniques with symphonic orchestrations featuring Britain's top musicians and arrangers, notably Ivor Raymonde. Scott served as effective co-producer of the band's records throughout this period (alongside their named producer, Johnny Franz and engineer Peter Oliff), later described as a "parallel, if invisible Walker Brothers." Many of their earlier numbers had a driving beat, but with the release of their third album, Images, in 1967 ballads predominated.

By 1967, John Walker's musical influence on the Walker Brothers had waned (although he sang lead on a cover of "Blueberry Hill" and contributed two original compositions), which led to tensions between him and Scott. At the same time, Scott was finding the group a chafing experience: "There was a lot of pressure. I was coming up with all the material for the boys, and I was having to find songs and getting the sessions together. Everyone relied on me, and it just got on top of me. I think I just got irritated with it all." Artistic differences and the stresses stemming from overwhelming pop stardom led to the break-up of the Walker Brothers the same year, although they reunited briefly for a tour of Japan in 1968.

1967–1974: Solo work
For his solo career, Walker shed the Walker Brothers' mantle and worked in a style clearly glimpsed on Images. Initially, this led to a continuation of his previous band's success. Walker's first four albums, titled Scott (1967), Scott 2 (1968), Scott 3 (1969), and Scott: Scott Walker Sings Songs from his TV Series (1969), all sold in large numbers, with Scott 2 topping the British charts.

During this period, Walker combined his earlier teen appeal with a darker, more idiosyncratic approach (which had been hinted at in songs like "Orpheus" on the Images album). While his vocal style remained consistent with the Walker Brothers, he now drove a fine line between classic ballads, Broadway hits and his own compositions, and also included risqué recordings of Jacques Brel songs (translated by Mort Shuman, who was also responsible for the hit musical Jacques Brel is Alive and Well and Living in Paris). Walker's own original songs of this period were influenced by Brel and Léo Ferré as he explored European musical roots while expressing his own American experience and reaching a new maturity as a recording artist.

Walker continued to grow as a producer. In 1968 (during the brief Walker Brothers reunion and tour of Japan), he produced a single with the Japanese rock group the Carnabeats, featuring Gary Walker on vocals. Upon his return to the UK, he produced a solo album for the Walker Brothers' musical director and guitarist Terry Smith. In 1968, Walker also produced Ray Warleigh's First Album. According to Anthony Reynolds, "[Warleigh's] album, recorded on December 13 and released in the following year, had little in common with the more esoteric progressive jazz that Scott was digging at the time, and the result veered more toward pleasantly middle-of-the-road muzak than the jazz fusion just around the corner." In 1968, Scott Walker also produced John Maus's solo single "Woman".

Walker's own relationship with fame, and the concentrated attention which it brought to him, remained a problem for his emotional well-being. He became reclusive and increasingly distanced from his audience. In 1968 he threw himself into an intense study of contemporary and classical music, which included a sojourn in Quarr Abbey, a Catholic Benedictine monastery in Ryde on the Isle of Wight, to study Gregorian chant, building on an interest in lieder and classical musical modes.

At the peak of his fame in 1969, Walker was given his own BBC TV series, Scott, featuring solo Walker performances of ballads, big band standards, Brel songs and his own compositions. Archival footage of the show is extremely rare as recordings were not conserved. However, audio selections from the show were released in 2019 as the box set Live on Air 1968-1969. In later interviews Walker has suggested that by the time of his third solo LP, a self-indulgent complacency had crept into his choice of material. His fourth solo album, Scott: Scott Walker Sings Songs from his TV Series, exemplified the problems he was having in failing to balance his own creative work with the demands of the entertainment industry and of his manager Maurice King, who seemed determined to mould his protégé into a new Andy Williams or Frank Sinatra. Despite the failure of the Scott TV show, the aforementioned companion LP Scott: Scott Walker Sings Songs from his TV Series was a commercial success, reaching the top 10 of the UK Albums Chart - Walker's last album to do so.

Having parted company with King, Walker released his fifth solo LP – Scott 4 – in 1969. Compensating for his recent dip into passivity, this was his first record to be made up entirely of self-penned material. The album with songs from the TV series was deleted soon after. It has been speculated that Walker's decision to release Scott 4 under his birth name of Scott Engel contributed to its chart failure. All subsequent re-issues of the album have been released under his stage name. As Sean O'Hagan wrote in The Guardian, "Now recognised as one of his greatest recordings, it sold poorly. The world was not ready for the existentialist musings of a pop singer whose touchstones were the films of Kurosawa and Bergman and the novels of Kafka and Camus."

Walker then entered a period of self-confessed artistic decline, during which he spent five years making records "by rote, just to get out of contract" and consoling himself with drink. His next album, 'Til the Band Comes In (1970), showed a pronounced split between its two sides. Side A featured original material (mostly co-written with new manager Ady Semel) while side B consisted almost entirely of cover versions. Subsequent releases saw Walker revert to cover versions of popular film tunes and a serious flirtation with country music. The Moviegoer (1972), Any Day Now (1973), Stretch (1973), and We Had It All (1974) feature no original material whatsoever.

In the 2006 documentary Scott Walker: 30 Century Man, Walker describes these as his "lost years" in terms of creativity. He has also confessed to having surrendered his direction due to outside pressure:

1975–1978: The Walker Brothers reunite 
By the mid-1970s, Walker's career was at its nadir, and he joined back up with John Maus and Gary Leeds to revive the Walker Brothers in 1975. Their first comeback single, a cover of Tom Rush's song "No Regrets", from the album of the same title reached number 7 in the UK Singles Chart, some months after its release. However, the parent album peaked at only number 49 in the UK Albums Chart. The two singles from the next album Lines (its title track, which Scott regarded as the best single the group ever released, and "We're All Alone") both failed to chart, and the album fared no better.

With the imminent demise of their record label, the Walkers collaborated on an album of original material that was in stark contrast to the country-flavoured tunes of the previous 1970s albums. The resulting album, Nite Flights, was released in 1978 with each of the Brothers writing and singing their own compositions. The opening four songs were Scott's, the final four John's, while the middle pair were by Gary. Scott's four songs – "Nite Flights", "The Electrician", "Shut Out", and "Fat Mama Kick" – were his first original compositions since 'Til the Band Comes In and represented his first steps away from the MOR image and sound he had cultivated since the commercial failure of Scott 4. The extremely dark and discomforting sound of Scott's songs, particularly "The Electrician", was to prove a forerunner to the direction of his future solo work.

In spite of a warm critical reception (with his contributions particularly lauded), sales figures for Nite Flights were ultimately as poor as those of Lines. The supporting tour saw the band concentrating on the old hits and ballads and ignoring the songs from their new record. Apparently now fated for a stagnant career on the revival circuit, the Walker Brothers lost heart and interest, compounded by Scott's increasing reluctance to sing live. By the end of 1978, now without a record deal, the group drifted apart again and Scott Walker entered a three-year period of obscurity and no releases.

1981–1995: A new solo voice (Climate of Hunter and Tilt)
In 1981, interest in Scott Walker's work was stimulated by the compilation Fire Escape in the Sky: The Godlike Genius of Scott Walker, containing tracks selected by Julian Cope, which reached number 14 on the UK Independent Chart. Building on the critical and sales momentum of the compilation, Walker subsequently signed with Virgin Records.

In 1984, Walker released his first solo album in ten years, Climate of Hunter. The album furthered the complex and unnerving approach Walker had established on Nite Flights. While based loosely within the field of 1980s rock music (and featuring guest appearances by contemporary stars Billy Ocean and Mark Knopfler), it had a fragmented and trance-like approach. Many of its eight songs lacked either titles or easily identifiable melody, with only Walker's sonorous voice as the link to previous work. Like Nite Flights before it, Climate of Hunter was met with critical praise but low sales. Plans to tour were made but never came to fruition. A second album for Virgin was rumoured to be in the works (with Brian Eno and Daniel Lanois producing) but was abandoned after early sessions. Soon afterwards, Walker was dropped by the label.

Walker spent the late 1980s away from music, with only a brief cameo appearance in a 1987 Britvic TV advert (alongside other 1960s pop icons) to maintain his profile. He did not return to public attention until the early 1990s when his solo and Walker Brothers work was critically reappraised again. During this period Walker's first four studio albums were issued on CD for the first time and the compilation album No Regrets – The Best of Scott Walker and The Walker Brothers 1965–1976 hit number 4 on the UK Albums Chart. Walker's own return to current active work was gradual and cautious. In 1992 he co-wrote and co-performed (with Goran Bregović) the single "Man From Reno" for the soundtrack of the film Toxic Affair. Having signed to Fontana Records, he began work on a new album. In the meantime David Bowie covered Scott's song "Nite Flights" on his Black Tie White Noise album, which also contained the Walker inspired 'You've Been Around'.

Tilt was released in 1995, developing and expanding the working methods explored on Climate of Hunter. Variously described as "an anti-matter collision of rock and modern classical music", as "Samuel Beckett at La Scala" and as "indescribably barren and unutterably bleak... the wind that buffets the gothic cathedrals of everyone's favorite nightmares", it was more consciously avant-garde than its predecessor with Walker now revealed as a fully-fledged modernist composer. Although Walker was backed by a full orchestra again, this time he was also accompanied by alarming percussion and industrial effects; and while album opener "Farmer in the City" was a melodic piece on which Walker exercised his familiar ballad voice, the remaining pieces were harsh and demandingly avant-garde.

Lyrically, subject matter included the life and murder of Pier Paolo Pasolini (and his relationship with Ninetto Davoli), cockfighting, the First Gulf War, a conflation of the trials of Adolf Eichmann and Caroline of Brunswick, and a man talking to the corpse of Che Guevara.

1996–2005: Interim work (guest appearances, songs for others, Pola X)
In 1996, Walker recorded the Bob Dylan song "I Threw It All Away" under the direction of Nick Cave for inclusion in the soundtrack for the film To Have and to Hold. In 1998, in a rare return to straightforward balladeering, he recorded the David Arnold song "Only Myself to Blame" (for the soundtrack of the Bond film The World Is Not Enough) and also wrote and produced the soundtrack for the Léos Carax film Pola X, which was released as an album. In 1999, he wrote and produced two songs for Ute Lemper on her album Punishing Kiss, credited as N. S. Engel. (One of these, Lullaby, is only available as a bonus track on the Japanese version of the CD.) 

In 2000, Walker curated the London South Bank Centre's annual summer live music festival, Meltdown, which has a tradition of celebrity curators. He did not perform at Meltdown himself, but wrote the music for the Richard Alston Dance Project item Thimblerigging. The following year he served as producer on Pulp's 2001 album We Love Life (whose track "Bad Cover Version" includes a mocking reference to the poor quality of "the second side of 'Til The Band Comes In").

In October 2003, Walker was given an award for his contribution to music by Q magazine, presented by Jarvis Cocker of Pulp. Walker received a standing ovation at the presentation. This award had been presented only twice before, the first time to Phil Spector, and the second to Brian Eno. The release of a retrospective box set, 5 Easy Pieces, comprising five themed discs spanning Walker's work with the Walker Brothers, his solo career (including film soundtrack work), and the two pieces composed for Ute Lemper, followed soon after.
The British independent label 4AD Records signed Walker in early 2004.

2006–2019: The Drift, Bish Bosch, Soused, and others
On May 8, 2006, Scott Walker released The Drift, his first new album in 11 years. Critical acclaim for the album garnered a Metacritic score of 85.

In both composition and atmosphere, The Drift was a continuation of the surreal, menacing, partially abstract approach displayed on Climate of Hunter and Tilt. It featured jarring contrasts between loud and quiet sections; instrumentation was similar to Tilt in the use of rock instruments and a large orchestra, but the album also interpolated unnerving sound effects such as the distressed braying of a donkey, a demoniac Donald Duck impression, and (during a recording sequence captured on film) an orchestral percussionist punching a large cut of raw meat. Lyrical subjects included torture, disease, the relationship and eventual shared death of Mussolini and his mistress Clara Petacci, and a conflation of the 9/11 attacks with a nightmare shared by Elvis Presley and his dead twin brother Jesse. In contemporary interviews, Walker appeared more at ease with media attention, revealing a wish to produce albums more frequently and hinting at significant changes in the nature of his own material if and when it suits him. Although he mentioned the possibility of touring again with a compact, five-piece band in an interview with The Wire this never transpired.

In June 2006, Mojo and radio honored Scott Walker with the MOJO Icon Award: "Voted for by Mojo readers and Mojo4music users, the recipient of this award has enjoyed a spectacular career on a global scale". It was presented by Phil Alexander.
A documentary film, Scott Walker: 30 Century Man, was completed in 2006 by New York film director Stephen Kijak (Cinemania and Never Met Picasso). Interviews were recorded with David Bowie (executive producer of the film), Radiohead, Sting, Gavin Friday and many musicians associated with Walker over the years. The World Premiere of Scott Walker: 30 Century Man took place as part of the 50th London Film Festival. When The Independent released its list of "Ten must-see films" at the 50th London Film Festival, Scott Walker: 30 Century Man, was among them. A documentary on Walker containing a substantial amount of footage from the film was shown on BBC1 in May 2007 as part of the Imagine... strand, presented by Alan Yentob.

Walker released "Darkness" as part of Plague Songs, an album of songs for the Margate Exodus project, a re-telling of the Book of Exodus, the story of Moses and his search for the Promised Land. Ten singer-songwriters were commissioned by Artangel to write and record a song inspired by one of the ten biblical plagues. Walker's evocation of "Darkness" appears as the ninth.

On September 24, 2007, Walker released And Who Shall Go to the Ball? And What Shall Go to the Ball? as a limited, never-to-be-re-pressed edition. The 24-minute instrumental work was performed by the London Sinfonietta with solo cellist Philip Sheppard as music to a performance by London-based CandoCo Dance Company. The recording is currently unavailable. From November 13 to 15, 2008, Drifting and Tilting: The Songs of Scott Walker was staged at The Barbican, in London. It comprised eight songs, two from Tilt – "Farmer in the City" and "Patriot (a single)" – and the rest from The Drift: "Cossacks Are", "Jesse", "Clara (Benito's Dream)", "Buzzers", "Jolson and Jones" and "Cue". Each song was presented in a music-theatre manner, with the vocal parts taken by a number of singers, including Jarvis Cocker, Damon Albarn and Dot Allison. Walker collaborated with Bat for Lashes on the song "The Big Sleep" from her 2009 album Two Suns. He wrote the score for the ROH2 production of Jean Cocteau's 1932 play Duet for One, which was staged in the Linbury Studio in June 2011.

Walker's final solo album, Bish Bosch, was released on December 3, 2012 and was received with generally favourable reviews. In 2014, Walker collaborated with the experimental drone metal duo Sunn O))) on Soused, which was released on October 21, 2014. A year later, Walker composed the score for Brady Corbet's film The Childhood of a Leader; this was followed in 2018 by the score for Corbet's film Vox Lux, also featuring music by Australian singer-songwriter Sia.

Collaborations
As a record producer and guest performer, Walker worked with a number of artists and bands, including Pulp, Ute Lemper, Sunn O))), and Bat for Lashes.

Death
Walker died at the age of 76 in London on March 22, 2019. His death was announced three days later by his record company 4AD, which announced cancer as the cause of death and called him "a unique and challenging titan at the forefront of British music". Tributes included those from Thom Yorke, Marc Almond, and Neil Hannon.

Artistry and compositional approach
Initially working as an interpreter of other people's songs, Scott Walker had developed his own songwriting skills by the heyday of the Walker Brothers and by the time of his first solo album in 1967. In a 1984 interview he spoke of difficulty in writing songs: "I don't write songs for pleasure. I can only write when I have to – like I'm under contract, or to finish an album."

Walker's late 1960s and 1970s work was relatively conventional. On a superficial level, it followed the melodic orchestral pop template used by singers such as Frank Sinatra, Andy Williams and Jack Jones – mainstream artists whose career path he was initially expected to follow. Crucial differences came via the more avant-garde orchestrations of his arrangers (primarily Angela Morley (at the time known as Wally Stott), Peter Knight and Reg Guest) and by Walker's own approach to lyrics, which involved a cinematic mise-en-scene approach once described as "unsettling short stories, all the more creepy for their delicate orchestral backdrop." As his solo career progressed, Walker began working political themes into his lyrics. Among the first of these was "The Old Man's Back Again (Dedicated to the Neo-Stalinist Regime)" (from Scott 4). Further references came via his dramatisation of the work of a CIA torturer on "The Electrician" (Nite Flights).

Walker's next artistic development as a songwriter came when he jettisoned his remaining conventional lyrical concerns along with his remaining connections to formal popular song (and, by extension, the easy-listening ballads which he had been famous for). The New York Times described Walker as arriving at "the point where he barely needs melody anymore. Instead, there are whirring synthesizers, great orchestral blocks of sound, noises of unknown provenance." Despite the radical alteration of his methods, Walker commented that he did not consider himself a "composer" in the established sense of the term: "I think of myself as a songwriter, but I agree they are maybe not traditional songs. I know what people mean, but what else can you call them?"

Walker described his lyrical technique (assembling short blocks of text containing images that are sometimes seemingly unconnected and disparate from each other) as being similar to "a general, assembling troops on the battlefield." The Wire has noted that the short blocks of white-on-black text presented in the CD insert for The Drift is reflective of this. The roots of this compositional technique are apparent as early as the Scott Walker tracks on Nite Flights – the lyrics insert for the album clearly feature the technique, albeit with a black text on a white background.

Walker stated in the documentary film Scott Walker: 30 Century Man and in numerous interviews that for his entire career he had not listened to any of his own work after completion, either due to exhaustion from the project or self-criticism.

Legacy
In 2018, Walker published Sundog, a book of selected lyrics. The book is divided into six sections: "The 60s", "Tilt", "The Drift", "Bish Bosch", "Soused", and "New Songs". The foreword to the book was written by Irish novelist Eimear McBride.

Many artists have expressed their admiration for Walker or cited him as an influence, including David Bowie, Alex Turner, Marc Almond, Bauhaus, Goldfrapp, Neil Hannon of The Divine Comedy, Julian Cope (who compiled the Fire Escape in the Sky: The Godlike Genius of Scott Walker compilation in 1981), Jarvis Cocker, Anohni, Thom Yorke and Radiohead, Steven Wilson of Porcupine Tree, and Mikael Åkerfeldt of Opeth (particularly expressed in their joint project Storm Corrosion), Tim Bowness of No-Man, Leonard Cohen, Efterklang, East India Youth, Kevin Hufnagel, Ihsahn, Russell Mills, Dennis Rea, John Baizley of Baroness, and Brian Eno.

Discography
 

 Scott (1967)
 Scott 2 (1968)
 Scott 3 (1969)
 Scott: Scott Walker Sings Songs from his T.V. Series (1969)
 Scott 4 (1969)
 'Til the Band Comes In (1970)
 The Moviegoer (1972)
 Any Day Now (1973)
 Stretch (1973)
 We Had It All (1974)
 Climate of Hunter (1984)
 Tilt (1995)
 Pola X OST (1999)
 The Drift (2006)
 And Who Shall Go to the Ball? And What Shall Go to the Ball? (2007)
 Bish Bosch (2012)
 Soused (2014, with Sunn O))))
 The Childhood of a Leader OST (2016)
 Vox Lux OST (2018)

References

External links
 
 
 
 

 
1943 births
2019 deaths
Deaths from cancer in England
20th-century American composers
20th-century American male singers
20th-century American singers
20th-century British composers
20th-century British male singers
21st-century American composers
21st-century British composers
21st-century British male singers
4AD artists
American baritones
American crooners
American expatriates in England
American emigrants to the United Kingdom
American experimental musicians
American male composers
American male singer-songwriters
American people of French-Canadian descent
Art pop musicians
British baritones
British crooners
British experimental musicians
British male composers
British male singer-songwriters
British record producers
Challenge Records artists
Columbia Records artists
Drag City (record label) artists
Experimental pop musicians
Fontana Records artists
Liberty Records artists
Philips Records artists
Zoo Records artists
Naturalised citizens of the United Kingdom
People from Hamilton, Ohio
Record producers from Ohio
Singer-songwriters from Ohio
Virgin Records artists
The Walker Brothers members